was a pioneer Japanese botanist noted for his taxonomic work.  He has been called "Father of Japanese Botany".  He was one of the first Japanese botanists to work extensively on classifying Japanese plants using the system developed by Linnaeus. His research resulted in documenting 50,000 specimens, many of which are represented in his Makino's Illustrated Flora of Japan. Despite having dropped out of grammar school, he eventually attained a Doctor of Science degree, and his birthday is remembered as Botany Day in Japan.

Early life
Tomitaro Makino was born in Sakawa, Kōchi to a prestigious sake brewer.  His parents died during his early childhood, and he was raised mainly by his grandmother.  Though he dropped out of school after two years, he cultivated a strong interest in English, geography, and especially in botany.  In 1880, he became a teacher at the primary school in his hometown, where he published his first academic botanical paper.

In 1884, he moved to Tokyo to pursue his botanical interests at the University of Tokyo where he worked with Ryōkichi Yatabe. He married in 1890 and later had 13 children.

Career
In 1887, Makino started to publish an academic journal of botany. 

In 1936, he published Makino Book of Botany, a six volume text on botany, in which he describes 6000 species, 1000 of which he discovered.
He is best known for his Makino's Illustrated Flora of Japan, published 1940, which is still used as an encyclopedic text today.

In 1948, he was invited to the Imperial Palace to lecture on botany for Emperor Hirohito.

Legacy
In total, Makino named over 2500 plants, including 1000 new species and 1500 new varieties.  In addition, he discovered about 600 new species.

After his death in 1957, his collection of approximately 400,000 specimens was donated to Tokyo Metropolitan University. The Makino Herbarium in Tokyo and the Makino Botanical Garden on Mount Godai in his native Kōchi were named in his honor.  He was also named an Honorary Citizen of Tokyo.

Selected works
In a statistical overview derived from writings by and about Makino, OCLC/WorldCat includes roughly 270+ works in 430+ publications in 4 languages and 1,060+ library holdings. 

 Makino shokubutsugaku zenshū (Makino's Book of Botany) Sōsakuin, 1936 
 Makino shin Nihon shokubutsu zukan (Makino's New Illustrated Flora of Japan),    Hokuryūkan, 1989,

References

External links
With plants I live - Tomitaro Makino, a short biography
Makino Botanical Gardens on Mount Godai
National Diet Library photos and biography

20th-century Japanese botanists
Botanists active in Japan
People of the Empire of Japan
People from Kōchi Prefecture
1862 births
1957 deaths
19th-century Japanese botanists
Japanese taxonomists